Lincoln Beachey (March 3, 1887 – March 14, 1915) was a pioneer American aviator and barnstormer. He became famous and wealthy from flying exhibitions, staging aerial stunts, helping invent aerobatics, and setting aviation records.

He was known as The Man Who Owns the Sky, and sometimes the Master Birdman. Beachey was acknowledged even by his competitors as "The World's Greatest Aviator". He was "known by sight to hundreds of thousands and by name to the whole world".

Birth
Beachey was born on March 3, 1887, in San Francisco.

Following in his older brother Hillary's footsteps, he worked as a ground crewman for dirigible pilot Thomas Scott Baldwin. He helped build the dirigible California Arrow and made his first dirigible flight in 1905, at the age of 17. Later he helped design a faster, more aerodynamic dirigible known as the "Beachey-Baldwin".

Meanwhile, his brother Hillary began flying aeroplanes at the meet (the Gill-Dosh Curtiss-type biplane), and soon began experimenting with such craft, too.

At the 1911 Los Angeles airshow, Beachey made the first successful recovery from a nose-diving spin from an altitude of over 3,000 feet. No previous pilot had survived a similar situation.

After that, Beachey joined the exhibition team of aviation pioneer Glenn Curtiss. Unfamiliar with Curtiss' designs, he crashed three times while learning to fly them, but soon achieved mastery of this new design.

In June the organizers of the U. S.-Canadian Carnival offered $1,000 to the first person to fly an aeroplane over Niagara Falls. Beachey responded in his Curtiss D biplane, and on June 27, 1911, Beachey took off into a drizzle and flew over the lower falls of Niagara Falls, then above American Falls, before an estimated 150,000 spectators. While gradually climbing, Beachey circled his plane over the falls several times. After he completed this performance he dove down into the mists of the falls, within 6 meters (20 feet) of the surface of the Niagara River. Then he flew his plane under the Honeymoon Bridge 6 meters (20 feet) above the rapids and down the length of the Niagara Gorge. Local papers described his plane as looking like "a beat-up orange crate".

Although Wilfred Parke is credited with developing "Parke's technique" to recover from a tailspin, Beachey is also cited as having discovered the maneuver. He repeated the maneuver eleven more times to confirm that it worked.

Thus Beachey became an aviation superstar: In one year, 17 million people saw him fly. At the time, the population of the United States was just 90 million people. His achievements include inventing figure 8s and the vertical drop. He was also the first pilot to achieve terminal velocity by flying straight toward the ground. Several pilots died trying to imitate him. After the death of someone he knew, Beachey briefly retired. After 3 months, he came out of retirement and perfected a trick known as "the loop".

At the 1911 Chicago International Aviation Meet, Beachey raced a train—and let his wheels touch the top of the moving train as it passed underneath. Here he also won multiple awards for his stunts, and set a new altitude record. To do this he filled his tanks with fuel, then said he would point the plane's nose skyward and keep going until the fuel ran out. For an hour and forty-eight minutes he spiraled upwards until the engine sputtered and died. He then glided in spirals to the ground, and climbed out, numb and stiff from the cold.

In 1912, Beachey, Parmelee, and aviation pioneer Glenn Martin performed the first night flights in California with acetylene burners, fuses, and small noise making bombs dropped over Los Angeles. In 1913, Beachey took off inside the Machinery Palace on the Exposition grounds at the San Francisco World's Fair. At the last moment he would level the plane and zoom down the raceway, with his hands off of the controls, gripping the control stick with his knees. In a jest aimed at Blanche Stuart Scott, another member of the Curtiss exhibition team, Beachey dressed up as a woman and pretended to be out of control in a mock terror to hundreds of thousands.

Orville Wright said, "An aeroplane in the hands of Lincoln Beachey is poetry. His mastery is a thing of beauty to watch. He is the most wonderful flyer of all."

Solo career

In 1913, a Russian pilot, Captain Pyotr Nesterov, made the first inside loop. Frenchman Adolphe Pegoud later that year became the second and more famous person to do it. Beachey wanted to try it himself. Curtiss refused to build him a plane capable of the stunt, and Beachey left the flying team. At the same time, he wrote a scathing essay about stunt flying, stating most people came to exhibitions out of morbid eagerness to see young pilots die. On March 7, 1913, he announced he would never again fly professionally, believing he was indirectly responsible for the deaths of several young aviators who had tried to emulate his stunts. In May, he would cite twenty-four fatalities, all of whom were "like brothers" to him. He felt tremendous guilt about their deaths and the suffering of their families.

Beachey went into the real estate business for a time, until Curtiss reluctantly agreed to build a stunt plane powerful enough to do the inside loop. Beachey returned and, on October 7, took the plane up in the air at Hammondsport, New York. On its first flight, either a downdraft or a loss of speed following a turn caused the plane to dip momentarily. One wing clipped the ridgepole of a tent on the field and the plane then swept two young women and two naval officers off the roof of a nearby hangar, from where they had been watching the flight, contrary to Beachey's wishes. Beachey's plane crashed in a nearby field but he managed to walk away from the wreckage with minor injuries. (A coroner's jury ruled the death of the 20-year-old woman as accidental.) Beachey decided for the second time to leave aviation.

However, the sight of a circus poster changed his mind. The poster depicted a plane flying upside down, a stunt that had not been attempted yet. Beachey was determined to master the loop and upside-down flight, but decided to go it alone.

He tried making a living demonstrating loops on exhibition grounds, but soon found that people would not pay to see a stunt they could see easily outside the gates. He retired for a third time, but returned when his manager had an idea that he depicted in a poster: the "Demon of the Sky" against the "Daredevil of the Ground". Beachey was to race his plane against a racing car driven by the popular driver Barney Oldfield. The manager made sure there was a high fence around the exhibition grounds, forcing people to pay if they wanted to see the race. Beachey's plane was faster than Oldfield's car, but they took turns "winning", and crowds flocked to see their daily competitions. With the money he earned by racing, Beachey designed and built a new plane, the "Little Looper". He had his name painted in three-foot-high letters across the top wing. Soon he was flying multiple loops. Whenever he heard about another pilot setting a record for flying continuous loops, Beachey would promptly break it, flying as many as eighty loops in a row. Beachey and Oldfield toured the country, staging races everywhere they went. In Dayton, Ohio, home of the Wright Brothers, they performed to a crowd of 30,000.

After he first successfully completed a loop, he wrote a poignant reflection, saying, "The silent reaper of souls and I shook hands that day. Thousands of times we've engaged in a race among the clouds. Plunging headlong in to breathless flight, diving and circling with awful speed through ethereal space. And many times when the dazzling sunlight has blinded my eyes, and sudden darkness has numbed all my senses, I have imagined Him close at my heels. On such occasions I have defied him, but, in so doing have experienced fright which I can not explain. Today, the old fellow and I are pals."

In 1914, he dive-bombed the White House and Congress in a mock attack, proving that the US government was woefully unprepared for the age that was upon it.

In 1915, he had a large wooden model made of the battleship Oregon and had it anchored a mile offshore of San Francisco just before the Panama–Pacific International Exposition. The Navy lent him 100 sailors to man the fake vessel, which was loaded with explosives. Beachey flew his plane over the model, dipped, and dropped what looked like a smoking bomb. One explosion grew into fifty as Beachey swooped over the model predreadnought. The crew had already escaped aboard a tugboat, but 80,000 people onshore screamed and some fainted in the belief that Beachey had just blown up the Oregon.

Death
Beachey made his final flight at the Panama–Pacific International Exposition. Prior to the exposition, in 1914, he had the Beachey-Eaton Monoplane built. The plane was similar to the Morane-Saulnier H with the addition of tricycle landing gear and large ailerons trailing the wing, which made the wing shape similar to, and caused some to refer to it as, a Taube. It would also be the first exhibition of inverted flight in a monoplane. He had tested it at higher altitudes, and on March 14, 1915, he was ready for his first public flight.

He took the plane up in front of a crowd of 50,000 (inside the Fairgrounds—with another 200,000 on the hills), made a loop, and turned the plane onto its back. He pulled on the controls to pull the plane out of its inverted position, where it was slowly sinking. The strain caused the rear spars in its wings to break, and the crumpled plane plunged into the bay between two ships. Navy men jumped into action, but it took 1 hour and 45 minutes to recover Beachey's body. Even then, rescuers spent three hours trying to revive him. The autopsy found he had survived the crash with only a broken leg, but had died from drowning, unable to release his safety harness while falling. The engine from the wrecked plane was later acquired, still in working condition, by aviatrix Katherine Stinson and used by her in a tour of the Orient.

His funeral in San Francisco was said to be the largest in the city's history up until then. Vast crowds had followed his tours and it has been estimated 30 million people saw him in his career, 17 million in 1914 alone.  On the one year anniversary of his death, a memorial organized by aviator Edna Christofferson drew hundreds to pay their respects, and the San Francisco Examiner reported that Beachey's grave "was buried under an avalanche of floral tributes."

In popular culture
Beachey's final flight, which resulted in his death, was remembered in a children's jump-rope rhyme which was sung by children in San Francisco in the 1920s.

Beachey is also referenced in pages 19 and 20 of the fiction book Johnny Got His Gun. In the book he is flying over the main character's home town.

References

External links
 

  (BIOGRAPHER Frank Marrero's site)
  (Lincoln Beachey bibliography)
 
 
  (Amacord: Lincoln Beachey)
 
  (20,000 see Beachey loop the loop at fairgrounds)

1887 births
1915 deaths
Accidental deaths in California
Aerobatic record holders
American aviation record holders
Aviators from California
Aviators killed in aviation accidents or incidents in the United States
Barnstormers
Curtiss-Wright Company
Deaths by drowning in California
Flight altitude record holders
Members of the Early Birds of Aviation
Victims of aviation accidents or incidents in 1915
Burials at Cypress Lawn Memorial Park